Sheila Elorza Hernández (born 8 June 1996) is a Spanish footballer who plays for Eibar as a midfielder.

She began her senior career at Athletic Bilbao but played mainly for the B team, with only two Primera División appearances shortly before leaving the club in 2015. She then spent two seasons with EDF Logroño and one with San Ignacio prior to joining Eibar in 2018; she was appointed captain, and played an important role in the squad which gained promotion to the top tier in the 2019–20 season, at which point she agreed to her extend her contract to 2022.

Sheila has never been selected for Spain at any level, but was selected for the Basque Country squad in 2021 (these were two 45-minute matches and it is not clear if they are considered full caps).

References

External links

 
Sheila at BDFutbol

1996 births
Living people
Spanish women's footballers
Footballers from the Basque Country (autonomous community)
Women's association football midfielders
Segunda Federación (women) players
Primera División (women) players
SD Eibar Femenino players
EdF Logroño players
Athletic Club Femenino players
People from Greater Bilbao
Sportspeople from Biscay
Athletic Club Femenino B players
Primera Federación (women) players